Gramont, Grammont or Grandmont may refer to:

Gramont, Tarn-et-Garonne, France
Geraardsbergen, Belgium
two castles known as château de Gramont (Spanish Agramont) in Basse-Navarre, one in  Bergouey-Viellenave, the other in  Bidache
 Saint Theodulus of Grammont
Principality of Bidache (1570–1793)
 Le Grammont, a summit in the Chablais Alps
Grandmont Abbey in Saint-Sylvestre, Haute-Vienne, Limousin, France
the Order of Grandmont
domaine de Grammont in Montpellier, historically owned by the Order of Grammont
as a French surname or title
 Duke of Gramont
 Gramont family, an old French noble family, whose name is connected to the castle of Gramont 
 Michel de Grammont (or Grandmont, died 1686), French pirate
 Maurice Grammont (1866–1946), French linguist
 Grandmont, a neighborhood of West Detroit